The Philippine Basketball Association All-Star Game Most Valuable Player (MVP) is an annual Philippine Basketball Association (PBA) award given to the player(s) voted best of the annual All-Star Game.

Winners

* MVP from losing team.
** MVP was Import Player.

Multiple time winners

References

External links

 
Basketball most valuable player awards
Awards established in 1989
1989 establishments in the Philippines